Piletocera sodalis is a species of moth in the family Crambidae. It was described by John Henry Leech in 1889. It is found in Japan, Myanmar, China and Korea.

References

sodalis
Moths of Asia
Moths described in 1889